The 2010 Big East men's basketball tournament, a part of the 2009-10 NCAA Division I men's basketball season, took place in March 2010 at Madison Square Garden in New York City. The West Virginia Mountaineers defeated the Georgetown Hoyas 60–58 in the tournament finals to receive the Big East Conference's automatic bid to the 2010 NCAA tournament. It was West Virginia's first Big East tournament championship. This was the second Big East tournament to include all 16 of the conference's teams. The teams finishing 9 through 16 in the regular season standings played first round games, while teams 5 through 8 received byes to the second round. The top 4 teams during the regular season received double-byes to the quarterfinals.

Seeds

Bracket
All times Eastern. Rankings from AP Poll.

First round

Second round

Quarterfinals

Semifinals

Finals

Broadcasters

Television

Radio

Local Radio

See also
 2010 Big East women's basketball tournament

References 

Tournament
Big East men's basketball tournament
Basketball in New York City
College sports in New York City
Sports competitions in New York City
Sports in Manhattan
Big East men's basketball tournament
Big East men's basketball tournament
2010s in Manhattan
Madison Square Garden